was a train station located in Kita-5-sen 11-gō, Pippu, Hokkaidō, and is operated by the Hokkaido Railway Company. This station permanently closed on March 13, 2021

Lines Serviced
Hokkaido Railway Company
Sōya Main Line

Adjacent stations

External links
Ekikara Time Table - JR Kita-Pippu Station (Japanese)

Railway stations in Hokkaido Prefecture
Railway stations in Japan opened in 1959
Railway stations closed in 2021